"Alive" is a song by DJ/singer Sonique, released in September 2003. The track reached number 70 in the UK, spending one week in the Top 75 Singles Chart.

Track listings
"Alive" (Album Version)
"Alive" (Benny Benassi Sfaction Club Mix)
"Alive" (Tomcraft Remix Edit)
"Alive" (Yomanda Remix Edit)
"Alive" (Video)

Charts

References

2003 singles
Sonique (musician) songs
2003 songs